Hemidactylus dawudazraqi is a species of gecko. It is found in Jordan and Syria.

References

Hemidactylus
Reptiles described in 2011
Reptiles of the Middle East
Fauna of Jordan
Reptiles of Syria